Paul-Joseph Blanc (25 January 1846, Paris - 5 July 1904, Paris) was a French painter who specialized in scenes from ancient history and mythology.

Biography
He studied at the École des Beaux Arts with Émile Bin and Alexandre Cabanel. In 1867, he was awarded the Prix de Rome for painting for his work The Murder of Laius by Œdipus and was named a Professor at the École in 1889. His studio in Montmartre also served as an art school.

In addition to his favorite subjects, he produced many portraits of politicians, including Georges Clemenceau, Léon Gambetta and Paul Bert.

He participated in the decoration of several buildings; among them the Panthéon, where he painted The Vow of Clovis at the Battle of Tolbiac, The Baptism of Clovis and The Triumph of Clovis. His decorative paintings may also be seen at the Opéra-Comique and the Hôtel de Ville

He created a design for postage stamps as well. They featured the figure of Marianne and came in denominations from one through five, seven and a half, and ten centimes. They were also overprinted for use in the French colonies and were commonly referred to as "Blancs". The original engraved wooden block used to create the stamps is at the Musée de La Poste in Paris.

Selected works

Further reading 
 Pierre Série: Joseph Blanc (1846–1904). Peintre d'histoire et décorateur. École du Louvre, Paris 2008, 
 Dictionnaire des peintres à Montmartre. Peintres, sculpteurs, graveurs, dessinateurs, illustrateurs, plasticiens aux XIXe et XXe siècles, Éditions André Roussard, 1999 
 Emmanuel Bénézit, Dictionnaire des peintres, sculpteurs, dessinateurs et graveurs, Gründ, 1999.

External links

 Short biography and photograph from Nos peintres et sculpteurs, graveurs, dessinateurs..., Sociétés de Beaux-Arts, (1897) @ Open Library
 Stamp Collecting World: The "Blanc" stamps and other contemporary designs.

1846 births
1904 deaths
19th-century French painters
French male painters
French history painters
French portrait painters
Painters from Paris
École des Beaux-Arts alumni
Academic staff of the École des Beaux-Arts
Prix de Rome for painting
19th-century French male artists